Leonard Rudolph "Lenny" Garner Jr. is an American television director and actor.

Early life and education
Garner grew up in Scranton, Pennsylvania. He joined Syracuse University's College of Visual and Performing Arts to become a professional actor, but decided to become a movie director. He graduated in 1974.

Career
Garner began his acting career guest-starring on Cheers, Moonlighting, Beauty and the Beast and the 1980s sitcom Brothers, making his directorial debut on the latter series. During most of the 1980s to early 1990s, Garner also worked as an assistant director on The Rockford Files, Miami Vice, Wings and the feature film The Blues Brothers.

Beginning in 1994, Garner has directed episodes of Sister, Sister, Two Guys and a Girl, NewsRadio, Just Shoot Me!, Sabrina the Teenage Witch, The King of Queens, One on One, Eve, The Game, According to Jim, Rules of Engagement, and True Jackson, VP, among other series.

References

External links

Garner on 'Cuse Conversations Podcast in 2019

American male television actors
American television directors
Living people
Place of birth missing (living people)
Year of birth missing (living people)
Syracuse University College of Visual and Performing Arts alumni